William McConnell Miller (1910–2004), was a Scottish born United States international lawn bowler.

Bowls career
He emigrated to the United States in 1928, joined the Gary Bowls Club in 1939 and became a United States citizen one year later in 1940.  He won a gold medal in the triples with Dick Folkins and Clive Forrester at the 1972 World Outdoor Bowls Championship in Worthing. He also won a bronze medal in the team event (Leonard Trophy).

Bowls official
He joined the A.L.B.A council in 1964 and was the first vice-president of the club.

Awards
He was inducted into the USA Hall of Fame. He died in 2004.

References

1910 births
2004 deaths
American male bowls players
Bowls World Champions
British emigrants to the United States